Nataly Cahana-Fleishman (born 2 December 1978) is an Israeli former professional tennis player.

Biography
Cahana, a right-handed player from Haifa, competed on the professional tour in the 1990s, primarily on the ITF Circuit.

She reached a best singles ranking of 232 and won a $25k title in Caracas in 1998. As a doubles player, she was ranked as high as 179 in the world and won five ITF titles.

From 1996 to 1999 she featured in eight Fed Cup ties for Israel, mostly in doubles.

Her only WTA Tour main-draw appearance came at the 1999 Tashkent Open, where she and partner Julia Abe made the quarterfinals of the doubles.

In the early 2000s, she played American college tennis for Old Dominion University (ODU) in Norfolk, Virginia. A two-time All-American, she made four NCAA Championship appearances in a row and finished with a team record of 231 career wins, across singles and doubles. In 2007, she began serving ODU as an assistant coach.

ITF finals

Singles: 3 (1–2)

Doubles: 13 (5–8)

See also
 List of Israel Fed Cup team representatives

References

External links
 
 
 

1978 births
Living people
Israeli female tennis players
Sportspeople from Haifa
Old Dominion Monarchs athletes
College women's tennis players in the United States